The Perfidy of Mary is a 1913 silent film directed by D. W. Griffith and starring Dorothy Gish and Mae Marsh as cousins Rose and Mary, with Walter Miller as Rose's suitor,	Harry Hyde as Mary's suitor, and Lionel Barrymore as Mary's father.  The picture has comedic overtones and also features Henry B. Walthall as a poet.

Cast
Dorothy Gish	...	
Rose
Mae Marsh	...	
Mary
Walter Miller	...	
Rose's Suitor
Harry Hyde	...	
Mary's Suitor
Lionel Barrymore	...	
Mary's Father
Kate Bruce	...	
Mary's Mother
Henry B. Walthall	...	
The Poet

External links
 The Perfidy of Mary in the Internet Movie Database

1913 films
American silent short films
American black-and-white films
1913 short films
Films directed by D. W. Griffith
1913 drama films
Silent American drama films
1910s American films